The Secret is the second extended play (EP) by American singer Austin Mahone. It was released on May 27, 2014 through Cash Money Records and features 6 songs. The Secret debuted and peaked at number 5 selling 46,000 copies in its opening week. The lead single, "What About Love", peaked at number 66 on the Billboard Hot 100. To promote the project, Mahone appeared in several televised performance, including a performance of "Mmm Yeah" at Capital FM, and a tour.

Background
In an interview with Billboard on November 4, 2013, Mahone informed the magazine that the album would see an additional collaboration with Flo Rida and maybe one or two other to-be-determined guests. He added: "It's coming along amazing – I'm just trying to have every little detail and just make it absolutely perfect for my fans." The direction of the EP reminisces a sound and themes of '90s pop music and has clear influences of Britney Spears, Backstreet Boys and *NSYNC. It was later announced that The Secret would be released on May 27, 2014.

Composition
The Secret contains a total of eleven songs, eight of which are in the standard edition, one song in the international edition and two songs in the Japanese edition. It is described by music critics as a pop and EDM project. According to Mahone, the sound is a mixture of pop, R&B, electronic dance and 1990s Backstreet Boys. When asked about the EP in an interview with MTV News, he said that the songs in his upcoming album would "sound like "What About Love" kind of like that EDM, like I said, old school/new school." Writing for So So Gay, David Lim noted the EP's sound to be influenced by Swedish pop producer Max Martin, who created songs for late-1990s teen pop stars such as Britney Spears, Backstreet Boys and *NSYNC. Lim later went on to call the EP a "shout of neon-bright tunes" and said: "The catchy melodies and electronic beats suit Austin’s own clean-cut, all singing-and-dancing persona, but at times it puts a wall between him and the listener."

"Mmm Yeah" is a dance-pop song which contains a "swirling" production, funk-influenced trumpets, a percussion-heavy four on the floor electropop beat, and influences of Chicago house, hip hop, and Latin music. The track heavily samples Lidell Townsell's 1992 single "Nu Nu". Lyrically, the song speaks of being rejected by an attractive woman walking down a street: "We can do whatever/ Do whatever we want/ When she walked past me I said 'hey, hey, hey' So tell me where you from where you want to go/ She walked past me like I ain't say a word". "All I Ever Need" is a "breezy" downtempo R&B and pop slow jam.

Singles
"What About Love" was released as the lead single on June 10, 2013 though included only in the international version of the project. The song peaked at number 66 on the Billboard Hot 100 but peaked at number 18 on the US Mainstream Top 40 charts.

"Mmm Yeah" was released as the second and final single on January 26, 2014 and features rapper Pitbull. The song went on to become Mahone's highest charting song to date, peaking at number 49 on the Billboard Hot 100, and peaking within the top 40 of various other countries including Australia, Canada, Spain, and the UK.

Promotional singles
"Till I Find You" was released as the first promotional single on April 18, 2014.
"All I Ever Need" was released as the second promotional single on May 13, 2014. The music video was released on May 22, 2014.
"Shadow" was released as the third promotional single on May 26, 2014 during a performance on the Today. Mahone released the official video through Vevo on May 29, 2014.
"Secret" was released as the fourth and final promotional single on September 24, 2014 along with the music video.

Critical reception

In her review of the EP, Elysa Gardner of USA Today gave a mixed response, saying: "To call him "baby Bieber" wouldn't be fair; the generically catchy tunes hark back to N' Sync, Backstreet Boys and even New Kids. His creamy yearning should set young hearts aflutter." Billboard gave the EP a three and a half out of five star rating, while Rolling Stone gave it a negative review of two out of five stars.

Commercial performance
The Secret debuted at number 5 on the Billboard 200 with sales of 46,000 copies in its opening week. As of November 2014, The Secret has sold 100,000 copies in the United States.

Track listing
Standard edition

Notes
 signifies a vocal producer
 signifies remixer

Charts

Certifications

Release history

References

2014 EPs
Albums produced by DJ Frank E
Albums produced by RedOne
Albums produced by Sean Garrett
Universal Republic Records albums
Cash Money Records EPs
Republic Records EPs
Austin Mahone albums